Uglyanets is a rural locality (a selo) and the administrative center of Uglyanskoye Rural Settlement, Verkhnekhavsky District, Voronezh Oblast, Russia. The population was  3,658 as of 2010. There are 53 streets.

Geography 
Uglyanets is located 38 km west of Verkhnyaya Khava (the district's administrative centre) by road. Podlesny is the nearest rural locality.

Cultural heritage 

Stephen's Church (Our Lady of Kazan) is located in Uglyanets. According to the decree of the Voronezh regional administration N 850 dated August 14, 1995, Stephen's Church has been designated as an object of historical and cultural heritage.

References 

Rural localities in Verkhnekhavsky District